In mathematics, Pisier–Ringrose inequality is an inequality in the theory of C*-algebras which was proved by Gilles Pisier in 1978 affirming a conjecture of John Ringrose. It is an extension of the Grothendieck inequality.

Statement
Theorem. If  is a bounded, linear mapping of one C*-algebra  into another C*-algebra , then 

See also
Haagerup-Pisier inequality
Christensen-Haagerup Principle

Notes

References
.
.

Inequalities
Operator algebras